Horror films released in the 2010s are listed in the following articles:
 List of horror films of 2010
 List of horror films of 2011
 List of horror films of 2012
 List of horror films of 2013
 List of horror films of 2014
 List of horror films of 2015
 List of horror films of 2016
 List of horror films of 2017
 List of horror films of 2018
 List of horror films of 2019

2010s
Horror